Pine Air is a census-designated place in Palm Beach County, Florida, United States. Its population was 2,190 as of the 2020 census. Pine Air is bordered by State Road 809 to the west and the village of Palm Springs to the south.

Demographics

References

Census-designated places in Palm Beach County, Florida
Census-designated places in Florida